The Under-Undergrounds (Portuguese: Os Under-Undergrounds) is a Brazilian animated musical comedy children animated television series created by Hugo Oda for Nickelodeon and premiered in May 9, 2016. The second season debuted in February 6, 2021.

Plot
The story tells the story of Heitor, a teen guitarist who is kicked out of his band because they think he is not cool enough. On his way home, upset about the happening, he falls in a hole and ends up in an underground world, inhabited by mutant creatures. Although it is in this weird place that he is going to find everything he was looking for: true friends and a rock'n'roll band that doesn't care about stereotypes, only the passion for music. The Under-Undergrounds, together, will have lots of fun adventures trying to help Hector find his way back home. Tolerance, diversity, companionship and self-knowledge are values that our "Rock Star hero" will learn in order to be respected and loved by the "Undergrounders".

Episodes

Characters

Main characters
 Heitor Villa-Lobos (voiced by Arthur Berges) – The protagonist of the series. Heitor is a 15-year-old boy who is the guitarist, vocalist and main songwriter of the Under-Undergrounds, and also the only human member of the band. Heitor was the guitarist in an Earth band called "Blitz Creek Bop", but after being replaced and expelled from it, he accidentally fell into an open manhole, landing in the Underground World. He later joined the band Under-Undergrounds.
 Layla Bach (voiced by Bruna Guerin) – The leader of the Under-Undergrounds, owner of the garage where they rehearse and one of the founders of the band. She is the keyboardist, vocalist, and only girl in the band. Layla is a pink-skinned mutant who has a pair of insect-like antennae on top of her head. Layla is also secretly in love with Heitor, revealing this secret only to her pet.
 Robert "Bob" Starkey (voiced by Yuri Chessman) – The drummer of the Under-Undergrounds and one of the founders of the band. Bob is an obese cyclops-like mutant with yellow skin.
 Ludwig "Lud" Waters (voiced by Fábio Lucindo) – The bass player for the Under-Undergrounds and a founding member. He is a blue-skinned mutant, with a large purple koala-like nose, and has hair covering much of his face, including his eyes.
 James Marshall (voiced by Robson Kumode) – The second guitarist in the Under-Undergrounds, after Heitor, and the son of Ozzy. James is the last to join the band, becoming a member of the Unders soon after the break-up of his previous band, "Attack 51". He is a red-skinned mutant (originally green) with a reptile-like tail and a series of thorns on his head, forming a kind of mohawk.

Recurring characters
 Britney Duhamel (voiced by Mariana Elizabetisky) – The biggest rival of Layla, a pretty, charming and attractive girl who is the leader and guitarist of one of the most popular bands at the school, consisting of her and her two best friends, Lily and Daisy. Britney is a fish-like mutant who has blonde hair, light blue skin, and fins in place of ears.

References

2016 Brazilian television series debuts
2010s Brazilian animated television series
Brazilian flash animated television series
Brazilian children's animated television series
Portuguese-language Nickelodeon original programming
Portuguese-language television shows
Anime-influenced Western animated television series
Television series about mutants
Teen animated television series